Ash Grove Township is one of twenty-six townships in Iroquois County, Illinois, USA.  As of the 2010 census, its population was 731 and it contained 316 housing units.

History
The first settler in the area that became Ash Grove Township was Robert Roberts, who arrived in 1833.  The township was formed when township government was adopted by the county in 1855.  Its current borders were established on September 15, 1868, when Fountain Creek Township was formed from a portion of Ash Grove Township.

Geography

Unincorporated towns
 Pitchin at 
 Schwer at 
 Woodworth at 
(This list is based on USGS data and may include former settlements.)

Cemeteries
The township contains these six cemeteries: Ash Grove, Cissna Park, Immanuel Lutheran, Saint John's Ash Grove, Saint Paul Lutheran and Schwer.

Major highways
  Illinois Route 49

Airports and landing strips
 Redeker Airport

Demographics

School districts
 Cissna Park Community Unit School District 6
 Crescent Iroquois Community Unit School District 249
 Iroquois West Community Unit School District 10
 Paxton-Buckley-Loda Community Unit School District 10

Political districts
 Illinois' 15th congressional district
 State House District 105
 State Senate District 53

References
 
 United States Census Bureau 2007 TIGER/Line Shapefiles
 United States National Atlas

Bibliography

External links
 City-Data.com
 Illinois State Archives

Townships in Iroquois County, Illinois
Townships in Illinois